Stahre is a Swedish surname. Notable people with the surname include:

Mikael Stahre (born 1975), Swedish football manager
Olof Stahre (1909–1988), Swedish equestrian

Swedish-language surnames